LSH may refer to:

 Locality-sensitive hashing in computer science
 LSH (hash function), in cryptography
 Lashio Airport, IATA code
 Lysergic acid hydroxyethylamide, an alkaloid
 Landing Ship Headquarters, a Royal Navy ship type
 Landing Ship, Heavy, a US and Australian ship hull classification symbol
 Legion of Super-Heroes - A DC Comics team set in the 30th century.

See also
 lsh